Tamauri Eugene Tucker (born 10 December 1988) is a cricketer who has played four One Day Internationals and one Twenty20 International for Bermuda.

References

External links 

1988 births
Living people
Bermuda One Day International cricketers
Bermuda Twenty20 International cricketers
Bermudian cricketers